The 2015–16 Serie B (known as the Serie B ConTe.it for sponsorship reasons) was the 84th season since its establishment in 1929. A total of 22 teams contested the league: 16 returning from the 2014–15 season, 4 promoted from Lega Pro, and 2 relegated from Serie A. Vacancies created by the bankruptcy of Serie A-relegated Parma and the demotion of Catania to Lega Pro due to match fixing allowed Brescia to remain in the league despite being relegated. Furthermore, Teramo was due to participate to Serie B but due to the allegations for match-fixing, the Courts decided to relegate Teramo in the last place of Lega Pro of the previous season. After the demotion of Catania, Virtus Entella was readmitted into Serie B as the best team of the relegated teams from the previous season. Furthermore, Ascoli was promoted into the championship after finishing second in Lega Pro Group B, second after Teramo before being stripped of the title for the match-fixing scandal.

Serie B introduced the "green card" at the beginning of the season. The green card was given to promote fair play and good acts. The green card was not given during the game, as it would alter sport rules, but awarded after the match to a player or coach who exhibited fair play by the referee. The player or coach with the most green cards at the end of the season was rewarded.

Teams
Relegated from 2014–15 Serie A:

Cagliari
Cesena

From 2014–15 Serie B:

Vicenza
Spezia
Perugia
Pescara
Avellino
Livorno
Bari
Trapani
Ternana
Latina
Lanciano
Pro Vercelli
Crotone
Modena
Brescia
Virtus Entella

Promoted from 2014–15 Lega Pro:

Novara
Ascoli
Salernitana
Como

Stadia and locations

Personnel and kits

Managerial changes

League table

Promotion play-offs
Six teams played in the promotion play-offs. A preliminary one-legged round, played at the home venue of the higher placed team, involved the teams from 5th to 8th place. The two winning teams played against the 3rd and 4th-placed teams in the two-legged semi-finals. The higher placed team played the second leg of the promotion playoff at home. Pescara won the promotion play-offs to Serie A.

Relegation play-out

Results

Top goalscorers

Attendance data

References

Serie B seasons
Italy
2015–16 in Italian football leagues